Xiguan Creek is a former river located in Xiguan, Guangzhou, China. Because of urban development, the waterway has been converted into culverts.

During the reign  of the Ming Dynasty Wanli Emperor (1572–1620), ships could sail along Xiguan Creek up to the Qingyun Bridge, which is today's Qingyun Li, Taoshadang, and Wanzhong Li. Since the time of the Qing Dynasty, Daguan River, which is connected to Xiguan Creek, has silted up as far as Guilan (called Ruixing Li today). In 1810, Qingyun Li, Taoshadang, and Wanzhong Li were reclaimed. Daguan River ends at 14-Pu Pier, at today's Tu Di Gong Temple in Ruixing Li. According to Nanhaixian Zhi (1872), Ruixing Li had become land by siltation, and Daguan River reached only to Guangya Li. By 1954 only the waterway to the west of Niuru Bridge remained.

Rivers of Guangdong
Liwan District